Nevenka Lisak is a Croatian former competitive figure skater. She represented Yugoslavia during the 1980s. She competed at five European Championships, achieving her best result, 19th, at the 1984 European Championships in Budapest, Hungary. She trained at KKK Medveščak in Zagreb.

Competitive highlights

References 

20th-century births
Croatian female single skaters
Living people
Sportspeople from Zagreb
Yugoslav female single skaters
Year of birth missing (living people)